Rebecca Lynn Grassl Bradley (born August 2, 1971) is an American lawyer and justice of the Wisconsin Supreme Court, serving since 2015. She has been a state judge in Wisconsin since 2012. She was appointed to the Supreme Court by Governor Scott Walker in 2015, and won election to a 10-year term in 2016.

Early life and education
Born in Milwaukee, Bradley graduated from Marquette University in 1993 and the University of Wisconsin Law School in 1996.

In 2016, she apologized for columns she wrote for the Marquette Tribune under a former name, Rebecca Grassl. Quotes from her 1992 columns include, "one will be better off contracting AIDS than developing cancer, because those afflicted with the politically correct disease will get all the funding," and "how sad that the lives of degenerate drug addicts and queers are valued more than the innocent lives of more prevalent ailments." She also wrote, "but the homosexuals and drug addicts who do essentially kill themselves and others through their own behavior deservedly receive none of my sympathy."

Early law career 
Bradley worked as an attorney at several Milwaukee law firms, specializing in commercial litigation and intellectual property law, and as a software company executive.  Considered a conservative, Bradley served as president of the Milwaukee Federalist Society chapter and participated in the Thomas More Society and the Republican National Lawyers Association. Bradley was a contributor to the campaign of Wisconsin Governor Scott Walker, a Republican.

In December 2012, Walker appointed Bradley to the Milwaukee County Circuit Court, where she served in the children's court division. She was elected to a six-year term on the court in April 2013, receiving substantial support from the conservative Wisconsin Club for Growth.

Supreme Court

2015 appointment 
In May 2015, Walker elevated Bradley to the Wisconsin Court of Appeals to fill a vacancy caused by the death of Judge Ralph Adam Fine. After the death of Justice N. Patrick Crooks in 2015, Bradley was appointed by Governor Walker to serve as a justice of the Wisconsin Supreme Court for the remainder of Crooks' term.

2016 Supreme Court election

After Crooks' death, Bradley, JoAnne Kloppenburg (who narrowly lost a race for the Wisconsin Supreme Court in 2011), and Martin Joseph "Joe" Donald each announced their candidacy for the seat in the 2016 election. In the February 16 primary, Bradley edged Kloppenburg 44.7–43.2%, moving the two of them on to the general election in an even race.

Bradley's homophobic writings that she wrote in the Marquette University student newspaper in 1992 while an undergraduate stirred controversy during the race. She had written letters to the editor and a column for the Marquette Tribune, in which she stated she held no sympathy for AIDS patients because they were "degenerates" who had effectively chosen to kill themselves. She also referred to gays as "queers". She called the plurality of Americans who voted for Clinton "either totally stupid or entirely evil". She blasted supporters of abortion as murderers, and compared abortion to the Holocaust and slavery. She attacked feminists as "angry, militant, man-hating lesbians who abhor the traditional family" and defended Camille Paglia, who had written in a 1991 column that "women who get drunk at frat parties are 'fools' and women who go upstairs with frat brothers are 'idiots'." Bradley wrote that Paglia had "legitimately suggested that women play a role in date rape." Bradley apologized for her student writings in 2016, shortly after they had stirred controversy.

Pre-election polls showed Bradley with a slight lead, but with a significant portion of the electorate still undecided. She was projected as the winner by a 53–47% margin on election night, and she quoted Winston Churchill at the end of her victory speech: "There is nothing more exhilarating than being shot at without result."

Tenure 
In June 2019, Bradley wrote the majority opinion for the Wisconsin Supreme Court where the conservatives on the court upheld a series of laws that the Republican-led Wisconsin legislature and Republican Governor Scott Walker passed during a lame-duck session in order to limit the powers of the incoming Democratic Governor (Tony Evers) and Attorney General (Josh Kaul).

COVID-19 pandemic 
During the coronavirus pandemic, she dissented to a Wisconsin Supreme Court order that ordered the postponement of jury trials and the suspension of in-person court proceedings for public health reasons.

In April 2020, during the pandemic, she joined the conservative majority on the Wisconsin Supreme Court in striking down Governor Evers' order to postpone a 7 April Wisconsin election due to the public health risks of the coronavirus. She voted in person on April 2, although casting a ballot in person before the date of the election is considered an absentee vote in Wisconsin. Examination of Justice Bradley's voting record demonstrates that she voted in person on Election Day in 4 of the 5 previous elections.

In May 2020, she questioned the stay-at-home orders issued by the Wisconsin Department of Health Services Secretary Andrea Palm. She compared the stay-at-home orders to the internment of Japanese-Americans during World War II, and labeled it "tyrannic."

In November 2020, while COVID-19 cases were surging in Wisconsin, she was in the Wisconsin Supreme Court's conservative majority that prevented the City of Racine Public Health Department to order school closures.

Gun rights 
In 2021, Bradley was the sole judge on the Wisconsin Supreme Court to rule in favor of a man who argued that it was within his Second Amendment rights to brandish his firearms while he was intoxicated and arguing with his roommates. Bradley said that the conviction against the man "erodes a fundamental freedom."

Voting rights 
In 2021, Bradley wrote a majority decision for the Wisconsin Supreme Court that declined to change district maps that were in favor of Republicans. In her decision, Bradley wrote that questions about the redistricting maps "must be resolved through the political process and not by the judiciary."

2020 Election
She issued a dissonant minority opinion in the 2020 Federal Election. None of the dissenting judges said what relief should be given to the Trump campaign.

In the 2022 decision Teigen v. Wisconsin Election Commission which banned ballot drop boxes, Bradley wrote that the 2020 election of Joe Biden was illegitimate due to the use of these boxes.

Electoral history

Wisconsin Circuit Court (2013)

| colspan="6" style="text-align:center;background-color: #e9e9e9;"| Primary election, February 19, 2013

| colspan="6" style="text-align:center;background-color: #e9e9e9;"| General election, April 2, 2013

Wisconsin Supreme Court (2016)

| colspan="6" style="text-align:center;background-color: #e9e9e9;"| Primary election, February 16, 2016

| colspan="6" style="text-align:center;background-color: #e9e9e9;"| General election, April 5, 2016

References

External links
 Justice Rebecca Bradley biography on Wisconsin Supreme Court
 Justice Rebecca Bradley for Supreme Court (2016 Election)
 

1971 births
Living people
Lawyers from Milwaukee
Marquette University alumni
University of Wisconsin Law School alumni
Justices of the Wisconsin Supreme Court
Wisconsin Court of Appeals judges
Wisconsin Republicans
Politicians from Milwaukee
Federalist Society members
21st-century American judges
21st-century American women judges